Just One Day may refer to:

Events
Just One Day, an animal rights event spearheaded by the No Kill Advocacy Center

Literature
Just One Day, a 2013 Gayle Forman novel

Music

Albums
Just One Day, a 2009 release by Kim Sozzi
Just One Day EP, a 2007 release by Kevin Griffin and Jeremy Lister

Songs
"Just One Day", a song by Anything Box off of Peace
"Just One Day", a song by the Bangtan Boys off of Skool Luv Affair
"Just One Day", a song by Better Than Ezra off of Paper Empire

See also
Just Another Day (disambiguation)
Just For One Day (disambiguation)